Layton is an unincorporated community in Fountain County, Indiana, in the United States.

History
A post office was established at Layton in 1891, and remained in operation until it was discontinued in 1900.

References

Unincorporated communities in Fountain County, Indiana
Unincorporated communities in Indiana